Marion Bartoli and Émilie Loit were the defending champions, but Bartoli chose not to participate in 2005. Loit successfully defended her title, alongside Barbora Strýcová.

Seeds

  Yan Zi /  Zheng Jie (quarterfinals)
  Li Ting /  Sun Tiantian (semifinals)
  Maria Elena Camerin /  Tathiana Garbin (quarterfinals)
  Ľubomíra Kurhajcová /  Tamarine Tanasugarn (first round)

Draw

Results

References

2005 WTA Tour
Morocco Open
2005 in Moroccan tennis